Gyrocarpus is a small genus of flowering plants in the Hernandiaceae family with a wide pantropical distribution.

Species
 Gyrocarpus americanus Jacq. (Pantropical)
 Gyrocarpus angustifolius (Verdc.) Thulin (Africa)
 Gyrocarpus hababensis Chiov. (Africa)
 Gyrocarpus jatrophifolius Domin (Central and North America)
 Gyrocarpus mocinnoi Espejo (Mexico)

References

 

Hernandiaceae
Pantropical flora